A Few Drinks (Spanish: Cuatro copas) is a 1958 Mexican musical film written and directed by Tulio Demicheli and starring Libertad Lamarque, Miguel Aceves Mejía and Raúl Ramírez.

The film's sets were designed by the art director Gunther Gerzso.

Cast
Libertad Lamarque as Eugenia Pavel
Miguel Aceves Mejía as Miguel
Raúl Ramírez as Jorge del Río
Miguel Manzano as Felipe
Leonor Llausás as Elena
Celia Tejeda as cook
 as doctor
Amparo Arozamena as Panfilo's employee
Alberto Catalá as producer
 as maid
 as Don Panfilo
Antonio Bravo as Señor Núñez
Julián Colman
 as announcer
Guillermo Hernández as man with a mug
José Muñoz as Don Melquiades
Francisco Pando as bartender
Carlos Robles Gil as Party guest
Hernán Vera as Don Panfilo's client

References

External links

Mexican musical films
1958 musical films
Films directed by Tulio Demicheli
1950s Spanish-language films
1950s Mexican films